Old Fort may refer to 

in the Bahamas
 Old Fort Bay 
 Old Fort of Nassau

in Canada
 Old Fort 217 Indian Reserve, Alberta
 Old Fort, Quebec (also known as Old Fort Bay or Vieux-Fort)

in India
 Old Fort, Delhi

in Mauritania
Old Fort, Nouakchott

in South Africa
 Old Fort (Durban), a national heritage site

in Tanzania
 Old fort of Zanzibar

in the United States
(by state)
 Old Fort (Miami, Missouri), listed on the NRHP in Missouri
 Old Fort, North Carolina
 Old Fort, Ohio
 Old Fort, Wisconsin